Droga5 is a global advertising agency headquartered in New York City with offices in London and Tokyo.

History 
David Droga founded Droga5 in New York City in 2006. Droga said that he named the agency after the tag his mother used to sew into his clothes (He is the fifth of six children and his mother stitched labels in her children's clothing based on birth order).

In 2008, Droga5 opened a second office in Sydney in David Droga's homeland of Australia; this office was closed in September 2015 as Droga5 turned its focus to the European market and its London office, which opened in 2013.

In July 2013, William Morris Endeavor announced a significant minority investment in Droga5. According to The New York Times, "executives from both companies said the partnership would allow them to create more brand-supported content by combining their significant advertising and entertainment resources." Droga5's New York office relocated to Wall Street in 2014.

The sale of Droga5 to Accenture Interactive was announced in April 2019. WME Dragon Holdings LLC agreed on March 29, 2019, to sell its 49 percent interest to Accenture Interactive for $233 million. This assumed a value of $242.5 million for the 51 percent share owned by David5, LLC, identified in the Endeavor Group Holdings IPO filing as the majority owner.

In 2021, Droga5 announced the opening of a new Tokyo office, with plans to expand to Brazil and China.

Awards 
Adweek Agency of the Decade, International Agency of the Year 2020, U.S. Agency of the Year: 2012, 2014, 2016
Advertising Age Agency of the Decade,  Agency Innovator of the Year: 2019, Agency of the Year: 2016, 2021, Agency A-List: 2010, 2011, 2012, 2013, 2014, 2015, 2016, 2017, 2018 2021Campaign UK Independent Agency of the Year: 2018Cannes Lions Independent Agency of the Year: 2015, 2016, 2017Creativity Agency of the Year: 2007, 2011, 2015, 2016Design and Art Direction (D&AD) Advertising Agency of the Year 2019 and Black Pencil Award 2019Effies Independent Agency of the Year: 2015, 2017, 2018, 2019,Fast Company World's Most Innovative Companies: 2013, 2017, 2019, 2020

Notable campaigns
Amazon - Before Alexa
Android - Friends Furever
Brady Campaign - End Family Fire
Chase - This Momma Keeps Going
Facebook - Never Lost
HBO - For the Throne
Hennessy - Maurice and the Black Bear School 	
Honey Maid - This is Wholesome	
Huggies - Welcome to the World, Baby
IHOP - IHOb 
MailChimp - Did You Mean MailChimp?	
Marc Ecko - Still Free
Microsoft Bing - Decoded 
The New York Times - The Truth Is Hard to Find  + The Truth Is Worth It 	
Newcastle Brown Ale - If We Made It
Paramount+ - Journey to the Peak	
Prudential - Day One
Puma - The After Hours Athlete 	
The Great Schlep feat. Sarah Silverman	
Tourism Australia - Dundee (2018)
Under Armour - I Will What I Want
Rule Yourself
UNICEF Tap Project

References

External links 

Advertising agencies based in New York City
Companies based in Manhattan
Marketing companies established in 2006
American companies established in 2006
2006 establishments in New York City
2019 mergers and acquisitions
Accenture
American subsidiaries of foreign companies